María Begoña Ridal Giraldos (born 3 August 1975) is a retired Spanish goalball player who competed in international level events.

References

External links 
 
 

1975 births
Living people
Paralympic goalball players of Spain
Paralympic silver medalists for Spain
Paralympic medalists in goalball
Goalball players at the 1992 Summer Paralympics
Goalball players at the 1996 Summer Paralympics
Goalball players at the 2000 Summer Paralympics
Medalists at the 2000 Summer Paralympics
People from Tudela, Navarre
Sportspeople from Navarre